The Winder Building is an office building in Washington, D.C., just west of the White House.
It is located at 604 17th Street, Northwest, Washington, D.C.

History
It was designed by Richard A. Gilpin, (or Robert Mills), for W. H. Winder, a nephew of Gen. William H. Winder.
It was leased as government offices.
The government purchased it in 1854 for $200,000. It was originally covered in stucco, which was stripped and brick painted. The windows have been replaced.
The building is maintained by General Services Administration and occupied by the Office of the United States Trade Representative, since 1981.

It was threatened with demolition in 1974.
The building is on the National Register of Historic Places.

References

External links

 

Office buildings completed in 1848
Buildings of the United States government in Washington, D.C.
Office buildings in Washington, D.C.
Office buildings on the National Register of Historic Places in Washington, D.C.